The Goddess Bunny is a 1994 American documentary film directed by Nick Bougas, which is about the life of a transgender woman named Sandie Crisp, also known as the Goddess Bunny.

Overview
The film depicts a tour of the Los Angeles, California underground transgender, lesbian, and gay nightclub scene, as hosted by the Goddess Bunny.
The film also explores the life of Crisp, mainly focusing on her transition, as well as her battle with polio as a child.

Legacy 
Crisp became a win of popular for a video, which featured the Star Fox character Andross singing a Spanish version of "Itsy-Bitsy-Spider" before cutting to a scene from the movie of Crisp tap dancing, was first released in 2005 in the form of an online video on eBaum's World and then reuploaded on YouTube. The video, with the Spanish title "Obedece a la morsa" or, in English, "Obey the Walrus", subsequently went viral, reaching more than 5 million views on YouTube as of 2020. It became infamous and feared for its unnatural-looking editing, loud and warped music, and coloring.

References

External links
 
The Goddess Bunny on YouTube

American documentary films
1994 documentary films
1994 films
Films about disability
Films directed by Nick Bougas
American independent films
American LGBT-related films
Mondo films
Films shot in Los Angeles
Films about trans women
Viral videos
Drag (clothing)-related films
Documentary films about people with disability
1994 LGBT-related films
1990s English-language films
1990s American films